Douglas Luiz Soares de Paulo (born 9 May 1998), known as Douglas Luiz, is a Brazilian professional footballer who plays as a defensive midfielder for  club Aston Villa and the Brazil national team.

Douglas Luiz is a product of the Vasco da Gama academy in Rio de Janeiro. He was signed at the age of 19 by Manchester City in 2017 but never played a competitive match during his time at the club due to work permit difficulties, being loaned out to La Liga side Girona twice. Aston Villa signed Luiz in July 2019. He is an Olympic champion, winning gold at the 2020 Summer Olympics Men's Football Final.

Club career

Vasco da Gama
Douglas Luiz was born in Rio de Janeiro and joined Vasco da Gama's youth setup in 2013, aged 14, after being approved in a number of tests held in Itaguaí. In July 2016, he was promoted to the first team by manager Jorginho due to Marcelo Mattos' injury.

Douglas Luiz made his first team debut on 27 August 2016, coming on as a second-half substitute for Fellype Gabriel in a 2–2 away draw against Tupi for the Campeonato Brasileiro Série B championship. In his first start three days later, he scored his team's only goal in a 2–1 loss at Vila Nova.

Douglas Luiz remained a starter for the Cruz-maltino until the end of the year, as his side achieved promotion to Campeonato Brasileiro Série A. In the meantime, he also extended his contract until 2019, on 26 September 2016.

Douglas Luiz made his debut in the main category of Brazilian football on 14 May 2017, starting in a 4–0 away loss against Palmeiras. His first goal in the division occurred on 10 June, as he netted his team's second in a 2–1 home win against Sport.

Manchester City
Douglas Luiz completed a move to Manchester City on 15 July 2017, signing a five-year contract.

On 1 August, he was loaned to La Liga side Girona FC for his first season with the club. Douglas Luiz made his debut for the Catalans on 26 August 2017, replacing Portu in a 1–0 home win against Málaga CF.

On 31 August 2018, Douglas Luiz was again loaned to Girona due to the UK Home Office denying him a work permit.

Aston Villa
Douglas Luiz signed for Aston Villa on 25 July 2019, subject to a work permit. His work permit was granted, and he officially became an Aston Villa player on 7 August. On 17 August, Douglas Luiz scored his first goal for Aston Villa against AFC Bournemouth; Villa would eventually lose the game 2–1. In August 2022, Luiz scored directly from a corner in the third round of the 2022–23 EFL Cup, and repeated the feat the following week in a Premier League fixture against Arsenal.

In October 2022, amid rumoured transfer interest from Arsenal and Liverpool - Luiz signed a new "long-term" contract with Aston Villa.

International career
Douglas Luiz appeared for Brazil at the youth level at the 2017 South American U-20 Championship and the 2019 Toulon Tournament, winning the latter.

On 19 November 2019, he made his senior international debut in a friendly match against South Korea, which Brazil won 3–0.

On 9 June 2021, Douglas Luiz was named to the Brazil squad for the 2021 Copa América. Brazil finished the tournament as runners-up to Argentina.

On 7 August 2021, Luiz won a gold medal as part of the Brazil football team at the 2020 Summer Olympics in Tokyo.

Personal life
Douglas is in a relationship with Aston Villa Women midfielder Alisha Lehmann.

Career statistics

Club

International

Honours
Aston Villa
EFL Cup runner-up: 2019–20

Brazil U23
Olympics Gold Medal: 2020
Toulon Tournament: 2019

Brazil
 Copa América runner-up: 2021

Individual
Campeonato Carioca Team of the Year: 2017
Toulon Tournament Best Player: 2019
Toulon Tournament Best XI: 2019

References

External links

 Profile at the Aston Villa F.C. website
 

1998 births
Living people
Footballers from Rio de Janeiro (city)
Brazilian footballers
Association football midfielders
Campeonato Brasileiro Série A players
Campeonato Brasileiro Série B players
La Liga players
CR Vasco da Gama players
Manchester City F.C. players
Girona FC players
Aston Villa F.C. players
Brazil youth international footballers
Brazil under-20 international footballers
Brazil international footballers
Olympic footballers of Brazil
2021 Copa América players
Footballers at the 2020 Summer Olympics
Brazilian expatriate footballers
Brazilian expatriate sportspeople in England
Brazilian expatriate sportspeople in Spain
Expatriate footballers in England
Expatriate footballers in Spain
Premier League players
Olympic medalists in football
Olympic gold medalists for Brazil
Medalists at the 2020 Summer Olympics